The 2014 Senior Bowl was an all-star college football exhibition game featured players from the 2013 college football season, and prospects for the 2014 Draft of the professional National Football League (NFL). The game concluded the post-season that began on December 21, 2013. It was sponsored by Reese's Peanut Butter Cups and is officially known as the Reese's Senior Bowl.

The game was played on January 25, 2014, at 3:00 p.m. CST, at Ladd–Peebles Stadium in Mobile, Alabama, between "North" and "South" teams, with the South team winning the game 20–10. Mike Smith of the Atlanta Falcons and Gus Bradley of the Jacksonville Jaguars served as the North and South head coaches, respectively.

Coverage of the event was provided on the NFL Network.

Rosters

North Team

South Team

Game summary

Scoring summary

Statistics

References

Senior Bowl
Senior Bowl
Senior Bowl
Senior Bowl